Amaury Nunes (born January 26, 1983) is a Brazilian former professional footballer who most recently worked for the Fort Lauderdale Strikers of the NASL as a general manager.

Career

College and Amateur
Having been a part of the youth setup at famed Brazilian club Flamengo as a teenager, Nunes relocated from his native Brazil to the United States in 2004 to attend college. He played four years of college soccer, initially at Oklahoma Baptist University, where as a freshman, Nunes scored 21 goals in 24 games. At Fresno Pacific University, as a sophomore Nunes scored 17 goals in 16 games, being selected as NAIA All-American Team. In 2007, in his senior year, Nunes scored 22 goals in 22 games, and was named  again 1st team NAIA All-American. Nunes scored a total of 70 goals in 4 years of College in USA.

During his college years Nunes also played for Fresno Fuego in the USL Premier Development League, helping the team to the PDL Southwest Division and Western Conference titles in 2007, while scoring 32 goals in 44 games during his four years with the team.

Professional
Prior to starting his career in United States, Nunes played professionally in Brazil for 2 years, in Rio de Janeiro for 3rd Division club Bangu A.C.

Nunes was drafted by the Chicago Storm of the Major Indoor Soccer League in the 2008 Major Indoor Soccer League College Draft, but did not take up the opportunity to play for the team, focusing on University, instead.

After finishing his studies, Nunes signed with the Charlotte Eagles of the USL Second Division, and made his debut against Pittsburgh Riverhounds, scoring two goals in a 5–1 Eagles victory.

With the Eagles, Nunes was named player of the week six times and scored 10 goals in 15 games. Nunes was also named USL All-League team.

After the USL season, Nunes spent a few months with MLS 2009 Champions Real Salt Lake. On March 3, 2010 Charleston Battery announced the signing of Nunes to a contract for the 2010 season. For two years in a row, Nunes has been on the Championship match of USL. In 2009 for the Charlotte Eagles, where they finished second place, and in 2010 for the Charleston Battery, where they were Champions. Nunes has also helped Rochester Rhinos during the 2009 USL play off run.

After a few successful years in the United States, Nunes had a chance to go overseas. Following the conclusion of the 2010 USL season Nunes signed a short-term contract with German Regionalliga Süd team Hessen Kassel. After a few months in Germany, Nunes had a good opportunity to go play in Asia.

In December 2010, Nunes signed a contract with Churchill Brothers, in the Indian Premier division I-League. In March 2011, Nunes helped the team to win the IFA Shield, one of the oldest tournaments in the Country.

On 19 July 2011, Nunes signed for Citizen to play in the 2011–12 Hong Kong First Division League.

On April 4, 2012, the San Antonio Scorpions FC Announced they have signed Nunes to play the 2012 season. On July 14, Nunes signed for TOT Sport Club from the Thai Premier League.

Honors

Charleston Battery
 USL Second Division: 2010
 USL Second Division regular season: 2010

References

External links
 Charlotte Eagles bio
 Fresno Pacific bio
 Amaury profile on Citizen FC official website

Living people
1983 births
Brazilian footballers
Association football midfielders
Charlotte Eagles players
Fresno Fuego players
Rochester New York FC players
Charleston Battery players
USL First Division players
USL Second Division players
North American Soccer League players
Oklahoma Baptist Bison men's soccer players
USL League Two players
Hong Kong First Division League players
Citizen AA players
San Antonio Scorpions players
Ocala Stampede players
Bangu Atlético Clube players
KSV Hessen Kassel players
Churchill Brothers FC Goa players
Amaury Nunes
Fresno Pacific Sunbirds men's soccer players
Brazilian expatriate footballers
Brazilian expatriate sportspeople in Hong Kong
Expatriate footballers in Hong Kong
Brazilian expatriate sportspeople in the United States
Expatriate soccer players in the United States
Brazilian expatriate sportspeople in Thailand
Expatriate footballers in Thailand
Brazilian expatriate sportspeople in Germany
Expatriate footballers in Germany
Brazilian expatriate sportspeople in India
Expatriate footballers in India
Footballers from Rio de Janeiro (city)